New York Private Bank & Trust Corporation is a bank holding company headquartered in New York City, United States.  Howard Milstein is the chairman, president and CEO. As of early 2007, it had US$17.3 billion in assets and was the 50th largest bank holding company in the United States. As of March 31, 2019 its assets were US$5.716 billion. The company had 1,221 employees in 2019.

History 
 2003 - ESB ACQUISITION CORP. was established as a Bank Holding Company
 2004 - ESB ACQUISITION CORP. changed to the new name NEW YORK PRIVATE BANK & TRUST CORPORATION
 2006 - New York Private Bank & Trust Corporation changed from Bank Holding Company to Financial Holding Company - Domestic.
 2010 - voluntarily relinquished FDIC deposit insurance and changed legal name to New York Private Trust Company

Subsidiaries

Notes

External links 
 Official site

Banks based in New York City
Banks established in 2005